The men's 200 metres event  at the 2001 IAAF World Indoor Championships was held on March 9–10.

Medalists

Results

Heats
The winner of each heat (Q) and next 6 fastest (q) qualified for the semifinals.

Semifinals
First 2 of each semifinal (Q) qualified directly for the final.

Final

References
Results

2001 IAAF World Indoor Championships
200 metres at the IAAF World Indoor Championships